HMS Launceston Castle (K397) was a  of the United Kingdom's Royal Navy, named after Launceston Castle in Cornwall. The ship was constructed during the Second World War and saw service primarily as a convoy escort.

Service history
Launceston Castle was launched by Blyth Shipbuilding and Drydock Company at Blyth in Northumberland on 27 November 1943.

In the Second World War she served as a convoy escort. Launceston Castle served in the 30th Escort Group commanded by Denys Rayner RNVR carrying his flag on board .

In 1953 she took part in the Fleet Review to celebrate the Coronation of Queen Elizabeth II.

References

Publications

 

Castle-class corvettes
1943 ships
Ships built on the River Blyth